Giovanni Francesco Pozzo (died 1619) was a Roman Catholic prelate who served as Bishop of Chiron (1617–1619).

Biography
On 2 Oct 1617, Giovanni Francesco Pozzo was appointed during the papacy of Pope Paul V as Bishop of Chiron. He served as Bishop of Chiron until his death in 1619.

References 

17th-century Roman Catholic bishops in the Republic of Venice
Bishops appointed by Pope Paul V
1619 deaths